Peter "Junior" Paramore (born 18 November 1968) is a Samoan former professional rugby union international, who also spent time playing professional rugby league.

Paramore was born in Samoa, and raised in New Zealand, playing his rugby in that country until 1995. In 1996, he left for the UK to take up a professional rugby league contract with Castleford Tigers (Heritage № 733). However, after one season, he moved to Bedford Blues professional rugby union side, helping them achieve promotion to the premiership in 1998. In 1999 he moved to Gloucester Rugby, joining his cousin Terry Fanolua. He remained there for five years, winning the 2002 Zurich Championship Final (the year before winning the play-offs constituted winning the English title) in which Gloucester defeated Bristol Rugby, and the Powergen Cup in 2003, before leaving to rejoin Bedford as a coach in 2004.

During his career, Paramore won 29 caps for the Samoa national rugby union team, taking part in three World Cup campaigns.

He is now the principal of his own rugby academy. He is now a coach at Totton College Rugby academy alongside Budge Pountney. He also coaches rugby at Canford School, in Dorset, England.

In 2018 he left Dorset to come to Bristol Bears rugby team. He is the current kit manager for the Bristol Bears.

References

External links
 Statistics at rugbyleagueproject.org

1968 births
Living people
Bedford Blues players
Castleford Tigers players
Expatriate rugby union players in England
Gloucester Rugby players
Hunter Mariners players
Rugby union flankers
Rugby union number eights
Samoa international rugby union players
Samoan expatriate rugby league players
Samoan expatriate rugby union players
Samoan expatriate sportspeople in England
Samoa international rugby sevens players
Samoan rugby league players
Samoan rugby union players
Sportspeople from Apia
Samoan emigrants to New Zealand
Rugby league second-rows
New Zealand expatriate sportspeople in Australia
New Zealand expatriate rugby league players
New Zealand expatriate rugby union players
New Zealand expatriate sportspeople in England
Samoan expatriate sportspeople in Australia
Expatriate rugby league players in Australia
Expatriate rugby league players in England
Counties Manukau rugby union players